The Plot: The Secret Story of the Protocols of the Elders of Zion is a graphic novel by American cartoonist Will Eisner released in 2005.

The book tells of the antisemitic conspiracy behind the falsified work Protocols of the Elders of Zion, written by the Russian-French writer Mathieu Golovinski in 1905.  Eisner was inspired to write it when a few years before his death in 2005 he learned Radio Islam was broadcasting the Protocols.

The book was released by W. W. Norton in 2005 with an introduction by Umberto Eco entitled "The Power of Falsehood".

In Eye Magazine, Steve Heller praised Eisner for taking on the subject, but criticized the work's "ham-fisted, curiously naïve methodology", exaggerated faces and gestures, and the grey wash artwork.  Nicholas Lezard in The Guardian found the wash "a dramatic instrument".

References

Works cited

Further reading

 

2005 graphic novels
American graphic novels
Historical comics
Works about antisemitism
Comics set in Russia
Comics set in the 1900s
Books by Will Eisner
Comics by Will Eisner